Calgary-Nose Creek was a provincial electoral district in Calgary, Alberta, Canada, mandated to return a single member to the Legislative Assembly of Alberta using the first past the post method of voting from 1993 to 2004.

History
The Calgary-Nose Creek electoral district was created during the 1993 electoral boundary re-distribution from the Calgary-McKnight electoral district.

The Calgary-Nose Creek electoral district would be dissolved in the 2003 Alberta boundary re-distribution and would be re-distributed into the Calgary-Mackay and Calgary-Nose Hill electoral districts.

The riding was named for the Nose Creek that winds its way through the northern part of Calgary.

Members of the Legislative Assembly (MLAs)

Election results

1993 general election

1997 general election

2001 general election

See also
List of Alberta provincial electoral districts

References

Further reading

External links
Elections Alberta
The Legislative Assembly of Alberta

Former provincial electoral districts of Alberta
Politics of Calgary